Pandrup is a town in North Jutland, Denmark. It is located in Jammerbugt Municipality, 6 km northwest of Aabybro and 17 km southwest of Brønderslev.

Until 1 January 2007 Pandrup was the seat of the former Pandrup Municipality.

History
Pandrup is first mentioned in 1470.

A train station was built in 1913 and was one of the Hjørring-Løkken-Aabybro railroad's largest stations. The station was built by Sylvius Knutzen. It was shut down in 1963.

In the 1970 Danish Municipal Reform three parish municipalities were merged to form Pandrup Municipality, with the municipality's seat and main town being Pandrup. The municipality lasted until 2007 where it was merged with Aabybro Municipality, Fjerritslev Municipality and Brovst Municipality to form Jammerbugt Municipality.

Notable residents 
 Ole Christensen (born 1955), politician and former MEP
 Pernille Holmsgaard (born 1984), handball player

References

Cities and towns in the North Jutland Region
Jammerbugt Municipality